Eilene Galloway (May 4, 1906 – May 2, 2009) was an American researcher and editor. She was often called "The Grand Dame of Space" and described as "an influential force in the development and analysis of domestic and international space law and policy".

Biography
Eilene Marie Slack was born in Kansas City, Missouri and graduated from Swarthmore College in Pennsylvania, with a degree in political science. She was known as Eilene Galloway after her marriage to George Galloway, an expert on the workings of Congress.

Her work with the Congressional Research Service in the Library of Congress began in 1941. During the Sputnik Crisis, Galloway was asked by Senator Richard Russel Jr to write a report on the impact of the Soviet Union being the first to send a satellite into orbit. Russel then introduced Galloway to Lyndon B. Johnson, who then asked Galloway to assist in the summarization of Congressional testimonies regarding Sputnik. 

Galloway worked for several decades on the United Nations Committee on the Peaceful Uses of Outer Space, and was editor of Space Law Senate Symposium She played a part in the creation of the Agency for the American Space Explorative and as a founding member of the International Institute of Space Law (IISL). 

She served on NASA advisory committees, and was a founding member of the International Institute of Space Law. Galloway published numerous articles.

Personal life 
Eilene Marie Slack married George Galloway, a colleague at the Congressional Research Service. Their son, J. F. Galloway, is a retired professor of political science. 

Eilene Galloway died in Washington, D.C. on May 2, 2009

Recognition 
In 1984 Galloway was the recipient of the NASA Public Service Award and Gold Medal and in 1987 she became the first person to receive a Lifetime Achievement Award from Women in Aerospace. She became a fellow of the American Astronautical Society in 1996 and in 2006 was the first woman elected an Honorary Fellow of the American Institute of Aeronautics and Astronautics. The annual international Galloway Symposium on Critical Issues in Space Law is named in her honour. Her papers are at the University of Mississippi School of Law.

See also
 Lyndon Johnson
 National Aeronautics and Space Act
 International Institute of Space Law
 Space law

References

External links
NASA(updated by Steve Garber, NASA History Web Curator )
 Happy 100th to the Woman Who Helped Create NASA 05.04.06 12:15 (GMT)29.10.2011
 Sputnik and the Creation of NASA: A Personal Perspective By Eilene Galloway NASA 12:14 (GMT)29.10.2011
NASA.gov MediaPlayer 12:18 (GMT) 29.10.2011

1906 births
2009 deaths
American centenarians
Women centenarians
American editors
Space scientists
Women space scientists